
Gmina Małomice is an urban-rural gmina (administrative district) in Żagań County, Lubusz Voivodeship, in western Poland.

Villages
Apart from the town of Małomice, Gmina Małomice contains the villages and settlements of Bobrzany, Chichy, Lubiechów, Śliwnik and Żelisław.

Neighbouring gminas
Gmina Małomice is bordered by the gminas of Osiecznica, Szprotawa and Żagań.

Twin towns – sister cities

Gmina Małomice is twinned with:
 Zeuthen, Germany

References

Malomice
Żagań County